Maria Alexandrovna Smolnikova (born 17 December 1987) is a Russian actress, best known for her role in the film Stalingrad (2013).

Biography
Maria Smolnikova was born in Sverdlovsk, Sverdlovsk Oblast, Russian SFSR, Soviet Union (now Yekaterinburg, Russia).
She studied at the experimental school in Yekaterinburg.

As a child, she acted in the Youth Theatre in Nizhny Novgorod, hoping to enter the Russian Academy of Theatre Arts (GITIS). However, the first two attempts were unsuccessful, only the third time Smolnikova was credited to the pilot course under the direction of Yevgeny Kamenkovich and Dmitry Krymov. She graduated from GITIS in 2011.

She works in the theater "School of Dramatic Art" led by Dmitry Krymov. Smolnikova became famous thanks to a lead role in the film by Fyodor Bondarchuk "Stalingrad" (2013).

Filmography

References

External links

1987 births
Living people
Actors from Yekaterinburg
Russian film actresses
Russian television actresses
21st-century Russian actresses
Russian Academy of Theatre Arts alumni
Actors from Nizhny Novgorod